The Baritone Wore Chiffon is the second book in Mark Schweizer's St. Germaine mystery series.

In this book, Hayden koenig travels to York, England, where he investigates the death of a bearded woman (and back home the murder of an unpleasant clown).

2004 American novels
St. Germaine (novel series)
American mystery novels
Novels set in York